Dysoptus tantalota is a species of moth in the family Arrhenophanidae. It probably occurs widely through the lowland Amazon rainforest. Currently it is known only from Guyana and southern Venezuela.

The length of the forewings is 4.1–6 mm for males. Adults are on wing from February to early March..

External links
Family Arrhenophanidae

Dysoptus
Moths described in 1919
Taxa named by Edward Meyrick